2 P.M. or 2PM may refer to:
 The time 2:00 p.m. as represented on the 12-hour clock
 2PM, South Korean boy band
 Still 2:00PM, an EP by 2PM
 The RT-2PM Topol, a mobile intercontinental ballistic missile in Russia
 2PM, a radio station based in Port Macquarie, NSW, Australia, currently owned by Broadcast Operations Group
 Patrick Mahomes II (born 1995), Kansas City Chiefs quarterback nicknamed "2PM"

Date and time disambiguation pages